Byssocorticium is a genus of corticioid fungi in the family Atheliaceae. The widespread genus contains 9 species.

References

External links

Atheliales
Atheliales genera